Stewardson Brown  (April 29, 1867 – March 14, 1921) was an American botanist who served as curator of the herbarium at the Philadelphia Academy of Natural Sciences. He collected plants in the New Jersey Pine Barrens, the Florida Keys, the Canadian Rockies, and Bermuda.

References

External links

1867 births
1921 deaths
19th-century American botanists
20th-century American botanists